Events from the year 2008 in the United States.

Incumbents

Federal government 
 President: George W. Bush (R-Texas)
 Vice President: Dick Cheney (R-Wyoming)
 Chief Justice: John Roberts (New York) 
 Speaker of the House of Representatives: Nancy Pelosi (D-California)
 Senate Majority Leader: Harry Reid (D-Nevada)
 Congress: 110th

Events

January 
 January 3 – Joe Biden drops out of the running for the 2008 U.S. presidential election. 
 January 5 – A levee bursts in Fernley, Nevada, flooding a large portion of the town and forcing the evacuations of 3,500 residents.
 January 7–January 11 – A tornado outbreak passes through eastern North America, producing at least 75 tornadoes across the mid-eastern United States and record-breaking temperatures in eastern Canada. Four fatalities are reported.
 January 7 – NBC announces the 2008 Golden Globe Awards Ceremony will be canceled due to the Writers Guild of America strike. The network announces the winners in a 1-hour news conference. Mickey Rourke and Tina Fey, among others, are winners.
 January 9 – President George W. Bush begins a tour of the Middle East with a stop in Israel. Other destinations include Kuwait, Bahrain, the United Arab Emirates, Saudi Arabia, the Palestinian Authority, and Egypt.
 January 10 – Bill Richardson drops out of the U.S. presidential election due to shortage of money.
 January 15 – The Food and Drug Administration declares that food from cloned cattle, swine, goats, and their progeny is safe to eat.
 January 18 – President George W. Bush announces an economic stimulus package, proposing $800 per individual and $1600 per couple in tax refunds.
 January 21 – Stock markets around the world plunge amid growing fears of a U.S. recession, fueled by the 2007 subprime mortgage crisis.
 January 22 – Actor Heath Ledger, 28, is found dead at his home in New York City. He would later be awarded a posthumous Academy Award for Best Supporting Actor for his work in The Dark Knight, released in July 2008. 
 January 25 – In Las Vegas, the Monte Carlo Resort and Casino catches fire.
 January 27 – The 2008 NHL All-Star Game occurs in Atlanta.
 January 28 – President George W. Bush delivers his final State of the Union address.
 January 30 – U.S. presidential candidates Rudy Giuliani and John Edwards drop out of the race.
 In January, Weardrobe online street fashion site is launched.

February 

 February 1 – The Food and Drug Administration issues a Public Health Advisory on Chantix, an anti-smoking medication, due to a possible "association between Chantix and serious neuropsychiatric symptoms."
 February 2 – The military accidentally kills nine civilians in a raid in Iraq.
 February 3 – The New York Giants defeat the heavily favored New England Patriots 17–14 in Super Bowl XLII, played at the University of Phoenix in Glendale, Arizona.
 February 5–February 6 – Super Tuesday tornado outbreak: A tornado outbreak, the deadliest in 23 years, kills 58 in the Southern United States.
 February 5 – U.S. stock market indices plunge more than 3% after a Non-Manufacturing ISM Report on Business shows signs of economic recession in the service sector. The S&P 500 fall 3.2%, The Dow Jones Industrial Average 370 points.
 February 7
STS-122: Space Shuttle Atlantis launches to deliver the European-built Columbus science laboratory to the International Space Station.
 The Senate passes a $170 billion economic stimulus package by a margin of 81–16.
 Charles Lee "Cookie" Thornton kills five and wounds two people at city hall before being shot and killed by police in Kirkwood, Missouri.
 Mitt Romney suspends his campaign of the Republican Party nomination for the U.S. presidency.
 February 10
 The 50th Annual Grammy Awards take place at the Staples Center in Los Angeles, California. Americans Herbie Hancock and Kanye West, among others, are winners.
 Maine holds its Democratic caucuses in the U.S. presidential election. Barack Obama wins 15 out of the possible 24 delegates.
 February 11
 A marine is arrested on suspicion of raping a fourteen-year-old Japanese girl in Okinawa, Japan. Japanese Prime Minister Yasuo Fukuda calls this "grave case...unforgivable". Ambassador Tom Schieffer later offers a personal apology.
 A former Boeing engineer and Defense Department analyst are arrested and charged with espionage for allegedly passing information to the Chinese government.
 February 12
 The 2007–2008 Writers Guild of America strike ends effectively at 6:51pm PST (02:51 UTC, February 13) as members vote to stop picket lines in response to a tentative deal reached by the WGA and the AMPTP three days earlier.
 Lawrence "Larry" King, a 15-year-old 8th grade student at E.O. Green Junior High School, is shot to death by 14-year-old student Brandon McInerney, for being gay.
 February 14 – Steven Kazmierczak opens fire, killing five and wounding 18 before fatally shooting himself at Northern Illinois University in DeKalb, Illinois.
 February 17 – The USDA recalls 143 million pounds of frozen beef from a California slaughterhouse.
 February 20 – The United States Navy destroys an American spy satellite, USA 193, with a missile, prompting international speculation that it is testing its capability to destroy the satellites of other countries.
 February 24 – The 80th Academy Awards, hosted by Jon Stewart, take place at Kodak Theatre in Hollywood, with the Coen brothers' No Country for Old Men winning four awards out of eight nominations, including Best Picture and Best Director. The film is tied in nominations with Paul Thomas Anderson's There Will Be Blood. The telecast garners 31.7 million viewers, making it the least-watched broadcast since 1974.

March 
 March 4 – John McCain secures the 2008 U.S. Republican Party presidential nomination after winning primary elections in Texas, Vermont, Ohio, and Rhode Island.
 March 6 – During the early hours of the morning, a small bomb explodes at an unoccupied military recruiting station in Times Square, New York City. No one is injured.
 March 12 – New York Governor Eliot Spitzer announces his resignation (effective March 17) days after being linked to a high-priced prostitution ring. Lieutenant Governor David Paterson succeeds the governorship of New York.
 March 13 – The colorized $5 bill is released, with nearly all of the features of the earlier colorized currency (the color-shifting numeral was not added).
 March 15 – A construction crane falls on a residential building in Manhattan, killing four people and injuring at least 17.
 March 18 – The Federal Reserve System cuts the federal funds rate by 75 basis points to 2.25%.
 March 24 – Relatives of victims of the Virginia Tech massacre report that the government of Virginia will offer victims compensation of $100,000 to forestall lawsuits.
 March 26 – Former First Lady of the United States Nancy Reagan endorses John McCain for the presidency.

April 
 April 7 – The Kansas Jayhawks beat the Memphis Tigers, 75–68 OT for the NCAA Basketball Championship.
 April 11 – The Newseum opens in Washington, D.C.
 April 15–April 20 – Pope Benedict XVI visits the United States. Among his destinations are the White House, The Catholic University of America, the United Nations General Assembly, and the site of the fallen World Trade Center. Benedict XVI also celebrates Mass at Nationals Park and Yankee Stadium.
 April 18 – The 5.4  Illinois earthquake hits southeastern Illinois with a maximum Mercalli intensity of VII (Very strong), causing several injuries and limited damage.
 April 20 – Danica Patrick becomes the first woman to win a top-level sanctioned open wheel car racing event.
 April 22 – Senator Hillary Clinton wins the Pennsylvania Democratic Primary.
 April 28 – General Motors announces that it will cut production of pickup trucks and sport utility vehicles in three plants in Michigan and one in Oshawa, Ontario and negotiate layoffs with the United Auto Workers and Canadian Auto Workers.

May 
May – The Stiletto Spy School is founded.
 May 1–May 2 – A tornado outbreak in the Southern and Central United States kills seven.
 May 2 – Iron Man, directed by Jon Favreau, is released by Marvel Studios as the first film of the Marvel Cinematic Universe (MCU) and the first film of its "Phase One" slate.
 May 6 – Senator Barack Obama wins the North Carolina Democratic Primary. Senator Hillary Clinton narrowly wins the Indiana Democratic Primary.
 May 7–May 15 – Several tornadoes cause substantial damage in the Midwestern United States and kill 28 people.
 May 12 – A leaked video of Fox News Channel anchor Bill O'Reilly from the early-1990s of him freaking out on camera goes viral on YouTube. In the video, O'Reilly is seen shouting "We'll do it live!"
 May 14 – NASA announces the discovery of Supernova remnant G1.9+0.3.
 May 15
 California becomes the second state after Massachusetts in 2004 to legalize same-sex marriage after the state's own Supreme Court rules a previous ban unconstitutional. 
 The United States Department of the Interior lists the polar bear as a threatened species under the Endangered Species Act, citing the melting of Arctic sea ice as the primary threat to the polar bear.
 May 20
 Senator Hillary Clinton wins the Kentucky Democratic primary while Senator Barack Obama wins the Oregon Democratic primary.
 Senator Ted Kennedy announces that he has a malignant glioma, a type of cancerous brain tumor.
 May 22–May 31 – A series of tornado outbreaks affecting the central plains of the United States is one of the largest continuous tornado outbreaks on record. A total 239 tornadoes are confirmed. There are 13 fatalities.
 May 24 – After over thirteen years, Kids' WB, The CW's children's programming block, ceases airing and becomes The CW4Kids when the network sells the air time to Grupo Clarin (through its subsidiary 4Kids Entertainment).
 May 25 – NASA's Phoenix spacecraft becomes the first to land on the northern polar region of Mars.

June 
 June 1
 A large fire engulfs parts of Universal Studios in Universal City, California, destroying a vault with the master tapes of as many as half a million songs.
 Landmark Broadway musical Rent ends its run after 12 years and more than 4,300 shows.
 June 3 – Barack Obama secures the 2008 U.S. Democratic Party presidential nomination, becoming the first African American presumptive presidential candidate for a major political party.
 June 4
Travis Alexander is stabbed multiple times then shot in the forehead by his former girlfriend, Jodi Arias, in Mesa, Arizona. The murder and subsequent trial received widespread media attention.
 The Detroit Red Wings win their 11th Stanley Cup, defeating the Pittsburgh Penguins.
 June 7 – Big Brown, previously undefeated, fails to become the first winner of the Triple Crown since 1978, finishing last at the 2008 Belmont Stakes.
 June 11 – Four Boy Scouts are killed and 48 others are injured when a tornado strikes Little Sioux Scout Ranch in Little Sioux, Iowa. Many acts of bravery occurred during and after the storm and many awards for heroism were awarded.
 June 13 – The Incredible Hulk, directed by Louis Leterrier, is released as the second film in the Marvel Cinematic Universe (MCU).
 June 17 – The Boston Celtics earn their 17th NBA championship by defeating the Los Angeles Lakers.
 June 18 – Tiger Woods announces he will undergo ACL surgery and won't play golf again until 2009.
 June 25 – Gunman Wesley Higdon opens fire in a plastics factory in Kentucky, murdering five before committing suicide.
 June 26 – The U.S. Supreme Court decides District of Columbia v. Heller, holding that the District of Columbia's ban on handguns, among other statutory provisions, is unconstitutional.
 June 27 
 After three decades as the Chairman of Microsoft Corporation, Bill Gates steps down from daily duties to concentrate on the Bill & Melinda Gates Foundation.
 Pixar Animation Studios' ninth feature film, WALL-E, is released in theaters.

July 
 July 10 – The 2008 Major League Baseball All-Star Game takes place at Yankee Stadium. The home American League wins 4–3 in 15 innings, giving home field advantage in the 2008 World Series to the AL champion, which eventually came to be the Tampa Bay Rays.
 July 18 – The Dark Knight, directed by Christopher Nolan, is released. It was the highest-grossing film of the year, with a worldwide gross of $997,000,000.
 July 23 – Vibra Bank in Chula Vista, California opens.
 July 25 – The Avenue of the Saints expressway project, linking St. Louis, Missouri and St. Paul, Minnesota, is finally completed with a ribbon cutting ceremony near Wayland, Missouri.
 July 29 – The 5.5  Chino Hills earthquake affected the Greater Los Angeles Area with a maximum Mercalli intensity of VI (Strong), causing eight injuries and limited damage.

August 
 August 8–August 24 – The United States compete at the Summer Olympics in Beijing, China and win 36 gold, 39 silver, and 37 bronze medals. Michael Phelps wins his eighth gold medal, breaking the record set by Mark Spitz, and sets the record for the most golds in a single Olympics.
 August 8 – Former U.S. Senator and vice-presidential and presidential candidate John Edwards admits to an adulterous affair with  former campaign worker Rielle Hunter after months of tabloid speculation, but denies being the father of her baby. Edwards would later admit to being the baby's father.
 August 15 – The U.S. government condemns the Russian invasion of the Caucasian country of Georgia.
 August 19 – Lady Gaga releases her debut album The Fame.
 August 24 – An aircraft crashes in Guatemala, killing 10, including four Americans on a humanitarian mission.
 August 25–August 28 – Barack Obama and Joe Biden are declared the Democratic presidential and vice presidential candidates at the 2008 Democratic National Convention in Denver, Colorado.
 August 26–September 1 – Hurricane Gustav makes landfall on Louisiana as Category 2 and kills seven in the United States, after making landfall on western Cuba as Category 4, and killing 66 in Haiti, eight in the Dominican Republic, and 11 in Jamaica.
 August 28–September 7 – Hurricane Hanna kills seven in the United States, and 529 in Haiti, mostly due to floods and mudslides.
 August 29 – Republican presidential candidate John McCain chooses Sarah Palin as his running mate.

September 
 September 1–September 14 – Hurricane Ike makes landfall on Texas as Category 2 and kills 27 in the United States, after killing four in Cuba, one in the Dominican Republic, and 75 in Haiti.
 September 1–September 4 – John McCain and Sarah Palin are declared the Republican presidential and vice presidential candidates at the 2008 Republican National Convention in Saint Paul, Minnesota.
 September 1 – Sarah Palin announces that her 17-year-old daughter Bristol is pregnant.
 September 7 – The US Government takes control of the two largest mortgage financing companies in the US, Fannie Mae and Freddie Mac.
 September 8 – The Rachel Maddow Show premieres on MSNBC.
 September 12 – A Metrolink train collides head-on into a freight train in Los Angeles, California, killing 25 and injuring 130.
 September 15 – Wall Street investment bank Lehman Brothers files for Chapter 11 bankruptcy protection.
 September 21 – The 60th Primetime Emmy Awards are presented. The telecast becomes the lowest rated and least viewed ceremony in its televised history. John Adams, 30 Rock, Mad Men, The Amazing Race, and The Daily Show with John Stewart, among others, are winners.
 September 26 – John McCain and Barack Obama engage in the first presidential debate, held at University of Mississippi and moderated by Jim Lehrer.
 September 28 – SpaceX Falcon 1 becomes the world's first privately developed space launch vehicle to successfully make orbit.
September 29 – the Dow Jones Industrial Average falls 777 points due to the financial panic.

October 
 October 2 – Gwen Ifill hosts the vice presidential debate between Joe Biden and Sarah Palin at Washington University.
 October 3 – Global financial crisis: U.S. President George W. Bush signs the revised Emergency Economic Stabilization Act into law, creating a 700 billion dollar Treasury fund to purchase failing bank assets.
 October 6 – NASA's MESSENGER spacecraft makes its second of three flybys of Mercury, decreasing the velocity for orbital insertion on March 18, 2011.
 October 7 – Tom Brokaw hosts the second presidential debate at Belmont University.
 October 10
 Connecticut legalizes gay marriage.
 The Alaska Legislative Council votes to release an investigative report that found that Sarah Palin had abused her power as governor in relation to the July 2008 dismissal of Alaskan Public Safety Commissioner Walt Monegan.
 October 15 – Presidential candidates John McCain and Barack Obama meet in their third and final televised debate at Hofstra University.
 October 20 – The HTC Dream, the first device to use the Android operating system, is released in the US as the T-Mobile G1.
 October 29 
Delta Air Lines merges with Northwest Airlines, forming the world's largest commercial carrier.
 The Philadelphia Phillies beat the Tampa Bay Rays in the 2008 World Series. The series score was 4–1.

November 
 

 November 4 – 2008 United States presidential election: Democratic U.S. Senator Barack Obama is elected as the 44th President of the United States and U.S. Senator Joe Biden is elected the 47th Vice President. Barack Obama becomes the first African-American President-elect.
 November 11 – Taylor Swift releases her second studio album Fearless. It would later become the most-awarded country album of all time. 
 November 14 – STS-126: Space Shuttle Endeavour uses the MPLM Leonardo to deliver experiment and storage racks to the International Space Station. There will be only three more launches of Endeavour after this mission.
 November 17 – Twilight, based on Stephenie Meyer's 2005 novel of the same name, starring Kristen Stewart and Robert Pattinson, premieres. 
 November 21 – Walt Disney Animation Studios' 48th feature film, Bolt, is released. Despite a relatively marginal box-office performance, the film receives the studio's strongest critical reception since 1999's Tarzan and is renowned for playing an important role in instigating what is widely referred to as the Disney Revival, as well as setting the studio in a new creative direction that would lead to other critically acclaimed features such as 2010's Tangled and 2013's Frozen.

December 

 December – The unemployment rate soars to 7.3%, the highest since December 1992.
 December 1 – The Dow Jones Industrial Average drops 680 points, its fourth worst drop in its history, after the National Bureau of Economic Research declared on the same day that the United States economy officially entered a recession in December 2007.
 December 5 – Retired American football player O. J. Simpson is sentenced to 33 years in prison in relation to a September 2007 armed robbery. Simpson would be granted parole and released in October 2017. 
 December 9 – Illinois Governor Rod Blagojevich is arrested by federal agents on public corruption charges. Prosecutors allege Blagojevich attempted to solicit bribes to occupy the U.S. Senate seat vacated by Barack Obama upon his election to the presidency. Blagojevich was later convicted.
 December 11
 Bernie Madoff is arrested and charged with securities fraud in relation to what would later be revealed to be the largest Ponzi scheme in history.
 Nobel Prize winners are announced. Americans Yoichiro Nambu, Martin Chalfie, Roger Y. Tsien, and Paul Krugman, among others, are recipients.
 December 18 – Iraqi journalist Muntadhar al-Zaidi throws both of his shoes at President George W. Bush during an Iraqi press conference.
 December 24–December 25 – Bruce Pardo, while wearing a Santa suit, kills nine people during a Christmas Eve party and burns down the house during the Covina, California massacre.

Ongoing
 War in Afghanistan (2001–2021)
 Iraq War (2003–2011)
 Late-2000s recession (2007–2009)
 SoccerGrow, a soccer charity is formed in June.

Date unknown
Braasch Biotech is founded in South Dakota.
Deathday Party, a Los Angeles-based experimental post-punk band is formed.
Edhance, corporation is founded.
Joma Music Group, Inc., music publishing company and record label founded.
Learn To Be, non-profit online tutoring organization is founded.
Sweet Water Organics, an urban farm is founded in Wisconsin.

Births 

 March 14 – Abby Ryder Fortson, actress
 April 17 – Gavin Warren, actor
 May 4 – Anthony Avalos, murder victim (d. 2018)
 May 31 – Kayla Han, swimmer
 June 9 – Stella Doreen McDermott, daughter of actress Tori Spelling and actor Dean McDermott
 June 23 – Lilliana Ketchman, dancer, YouTuber, and model
 July 15 – Iain Armitage, actor
 August 24 – Kaylie Trimble, actress, singer
 September 17 – Mia Talerico, actress
 September 18 – Jackson Robert Scott, actor
 October 9 – Bo, notable canine pet of Barack Obama
 October 24 – Liamani Segura, singer
 November 20 – Bronx Wentz, son of Pete Wentz and Ashlee Simpson
 December 3 – Garnett Spears, murder victim (d. 2014)
 December 27 – Tripp Johnston, son of Bristol Palin and grandson of Sarah Palin.

Deaths

January 

 January 1 – Salvatore Bonanno, leader of organized crime (b. 1932)
 January 7
 Philip Agee, spy and writer, died in Cuba (b. 1935)
 Edward "Buddy" LeRoux, businessman and American baseball executive (b. 1930)
 January 10
 Christopher Bowman, figure skater (b. 1967)
 Maila Nurmi, Finnish-born American actress and television personality (b. 1922)
 January 11 – Carl Karcher, businessman (b. 1917)
 January 13 – Johnny Podres, American baseball player (b. 1932)
 January 15 – Brad Renfro, actor (b. 1982)
 January 17
 Bobby Fischer, American-born Icelandic chess grandmaster (b. 1943)
 Ernie Holmes, American football player (b. 1948)
 Allan Melvin, actor (b. 1923)
 January 18
 Georgia Frontiere, American football team owner, entertainer, and philanthropist (b. 1927)
 Lois Nettleton, actress (b. 1927)
 January 19
 Frances Lewine, journalist (b. 1921)
 Suzanne Pleshette, American actress (b. 1937)
 John Stewart, singer and songwriter (b. 1939)
 January 22
 Roberto Gari, actor (b. 1920)
 Miles Lerman, Polish-born American activist and museum administrator (b. 1920)
 Heath Ledger, Australian actor and director, died in New York City (b. 1979)
 January 24 – Randy Salerno, television journalist (b. 1963)
 January 27 – Gordon B. Hinckley, minister and executive (b. 1910)
 January 29 
 Raymond Jacobs, marine, member of the Raising the Flag on Iwo Jima (b. 1925)
 Margaret Truman, singer, writer, historian, and daughter of Harry S. Truman (b. 1924)

February 

 February 1 – Shell Kepler, actress (b. 1958)
 February 2
 Earl Butz, 18th United States Secretary of Agriculture from 1971 till 1976. (b. 1909)
 Joshua Lederberg, Nobel molecular biologist and college administrator (b. 1925)
 February 4
 Harry Richard Landis, World War I soldier (b. 1899)
 Sheldon Brown, bicycle mechanic and writer (b. 1944)
 February 6 – John McWethy, journalist (b. 1947)
 February 8 – Phyllis A. Whitney, Japanese-born American writer (b. 1903)
 February 10 – Roy Scheider, American actor and boxer (b. 1932)
 February 11 – Tom Lantos, Hungarian-American United States Representative from California from 1981 till 2008. (b. 1928)
 February 12 – Oscar Brodney, screenwriter and lawyer (b. 1907)
 February 13 – Roger Voisin, French-born American musician (b. 1918)
 February 15 – Johnny Weaver, wrestler and sportscaster (b. 1935)
 February 21 – Ben Chapman, actor (b. 1928)
 February 24 – Larry Norman, musician, singer, songwriter, record label owner, and record producer (b. 1947)
 February 26 – Buddy Miles, musician (b. 1947)
 February 27
 William F. Buckley Jr., writer and commentator (b. 1925)
 Boyd Coddington, automobile producer and television host (b. 1944)
 Myron Cope, American football sportscaster (b. 1929)
 February 28 – Joseph M. Juran, Romanian-born American management consultant and engineer (b. 1904)

March 

 March 4 – Gary Gygax, writer and game designer (b. 1938)
 March 5 – Joseph Weizenbaum, German writer and computer scientist, died in Ludwigsfelde-Gröben (b. 1923)
 March 9 – Gus Giordano, dancer (b. 1923)
 March 12 – Howard Metzenbaum, Senator from Ohio in 1974 and from 1976 till 1995. (b. 1917)
 March 15 – Vicki Van Meter, aviator (b. 1982)
 March 16
 Ivan Dixon, actor, director, and producer (b. 1931)
 Gary Hart, wrestler and wrestling manager (b. 1942)
 March 20 – Abigail Rose Taylor, notable accident victim (b. 2001)
 March 22 – Cachao López, Cuban musician, died in Coral Gables, Florida (b. 1918)
 March 23 – Al Copeland, entrepreneur, died in Munich, Germany (b. 1944)
 March 24 
 Hal Riney, businessman, founded Publicis & Hal Riney (b. 1932)
 Richard Widmark, actor (b. 1914)
 March 28
 Herb Rich, American football player (b. 1928)
 Ron Slinker, wrestler (b. 1945)
 Helen Yglesias, writer (b. 1915)
 March 30 
Douglas Kent Hall, American writer and photographer (b. 1938)
Dith Pran, Cambodian-born American photojournalist (b. 1942)
 March 31 – Jules Dassin, film director, screenwriter, actor, producer, and husband of Melina Mercouri, died in Athens, Greece (b. 1911)

April 

 April 2 – Ray Poole, American football player and coach (b. 1921)
 April 5 – Charlton Heston, actor (b. 1923)
 April 8 – Stanley Kamel, actor (b. 1943)
 April 11 – Merlin German, soldier and charity founder. (b. 1985)
 April 12 – Barbara McDermott, last American survivor of the sinking of the RMS Lusitania (b. 1912)
 April 13 – John Archibald Wheeler, physicist (b. 1911)
 April 14 – Ollie Johnston, animator (b. 1912)
 April 16
 Joe Feeney, tenor (b. 1931)
 Edward Norton Lorenz, mathematician and meteorologist (b. 1917)
 Joseph Solman, painter (b. 1909)
 April 17 – Danny Federici, musician (b. 1950)
 April 21 – Al Wilson, singer (b. 1939)
 April 22 – Paul Davis, singer, songwriter, and musician (b. 1948)

May 

 May 1
 Buzzie Bavasi, American baseball executive (b. 1914)
 Elaine Dundy, American writer and actress (b. 1922)
 Jim Hager, American country music singer and television actor (Hee Haw) (b. 1947)
 Deborah Jeane Palfrey, American escort agency proprietor (b. 1955)
 May 2 – Beverlee McKinsey, actress (b. 1935)
 May 4 – Fredric J. Baur, chemist and inventor (b. 1918)
 May 5
 Irv Robbins, Canadian-born American entrepreneur (b. 1917)
 Jerry Wallace, American country and pop singer (b. 1928)
 May 8 – Eddy Arnold, American singer, songwriter, and musician (b. 1918)
 May 9 – Judy Grable, American professional wrestler (b. 1935)
 May 11 – Dottie Rambo, singer, songwriter, and musician (b. 1934)
 May 12 – Robert Rauschenberg, artist (b. 1925)
 May 13 – John Phillip Law, actor (b. 1937)
 May 15
 Alexander Courage, composer (b. 1919)
 Willis Lamb, Nobel physicist (b. 1913)
 May 16 – Robert Mondavi, winemaker (b. 1913)
 May 18 – Joseph Pevney, film and television director (b. 1911)
 May 20 – Hamilton Jordan, 8th White House Chief of Staff from 1979 till 1980. (b. 1944)
 May 22 – Robert Asprin, writer (b. 1946)
 May 23 – Cornell Capa, Hungarian-American photographer (b. 1918)
 May 24 – Dick Martin, comedian, television director, actor, and producer (b. 1922)
 May 26
 Earle Hagen, composer (b. 1919)
 Sydney Pollack, American actor, director, and producer (b. 1934)
 May 28 – Robert Justman, television producer and director (b. 1926)
 May 29 – Harvey Korman, American actor and Comedian (b. 1927)

June 

 June 2
 Bo Diddley, singer, songwriter and musician (b. 1928)
 Mel Ferrer, actor, director and producer, spouse of Audrey Hepburn (b. 1917)
 June 4 – Giorgio Tavernakis was born.
 June 6 – Dwight White, American football player (b. 1949)
 June 7 – Jim McKay, television sports journalist (b. 1921)
 June 9 – Algis Budrys, science fiction writer (b. 1931 in Lithuania)
 June 10 – John Rauch, American football player and coach (b. 1927)
 June 12 – Charlie Jones, television sportscaster and actor (b. 1930)
 June 13 – Tim Russert, television journalist and lawyer (b. 1950)
 June 15
 Johnathan Goddard, American football player (b. 1981)
 Stan Winston, film and television special effects and makeup artist (b. 1946)
 June 16 – Caylee Anthony, alleged murder victim (b. 2005)
 June 17 – Cyd Charisse, actress and dancer, spouse of Tony Martin (b. 1922)
 June 19 – Bennie Swain, basketball player and coach (b. 1930)
 June 21
 Scott Kalitta, race car driver (b. 1962)
 Kermit Love, puppeteer and costume designer (b. 1916)
 June 22
 George Carlin, writer, actor, comedian and obscenity law central figure (b. 1937)
 Dody Goodman, actress (b. 1914)
 June 24 – Leonid Hurwicz, Nobel economist and mathematician (b. 1917 in Russia)
 June 26 – Katherine Loker, philanthropist (b. 1915)
 June 27
 Polk Robison, basketball coach (b. 1912)
 Michael Turner, comic book artist (b. 1971)
 June 29 – Don S. Davis, actor and soldier, died in Gibsons, British Columbia, Canada (b. 1942)

July 

 July 1
 John Pont, American football coach (b. 1927)
 Mark Dean Schwab, murderer (b. 1968)
 July 3 – Larry Harmon, clown (b. 1925)
 July 4
 Jesse Helms, American politician (b. 1921)
 Evelyn Keyes, American actress and wife of John Huston and Artie Shaw (b. 1916)
 Terrence Kiel, American football player (b. 1980)
 July 6 – Bobby Durham, jazz drummer (b. 1937)
 July 11 – Michael E. DeBakey, surgeon and inventor (b. 1908)
 July 12 – Tony Snow, journalist and 26th White House Press Secretary from 2006 till 2007. (b. 1955)
 July 16 – Jo Stafford, American singer (b. 1917)
 July 22 – Estelle Getty, actress (b. 1923)
 July 25
 Johnny Griffin, American saxophonist (b. 1928)
 Randy Pausch, writer and computer scientist (b. 1960)

August 

 August 3 – Aleksandr Solzhenitsyn, Russian Nobel writer, died in Moscow, Russia (b. 1918)
 August 9 – Bernie Mac, American actor and comedian (b. 1957)
 August 10 – Isaac Hayes, American singer, songwriter, musician, and actor (b. 1942)
 August 11 – George Furth, American librettist, playwright, and actor (b. 1932)
 August 12 – Patricia W. Malone, American naval officer (b. 1924)
 August 13 – Sandy Allen, American tallest woman in the world (according to Guinness World Records) (b. 1955)
 August 15 
 James Orthwein, American businessman (b. 1924)
 Leroy Sievers, American journalist (b. 1955)
 Jerry Wexler, American music producer and journalist (b. 1917)
 August 16 – Roberta Collins, American actress (b. 1944)
 August 17 – Philip Saffman, English-American mathematician (b. 1931)
 August 19
 Julius Carry, American actor (b. 1952)
 LeRoi Moore, American musician (b. 1961)
 August 20 – Phil Guy, American blues guitarist (b. 1940)
 August 23 – Thomas Huckle Weller, American Nobel virologist (b. 1915)
 August 28 – Phil Hill, American race car driver (b. 1927)

September 

 September 1
 Don LaFontaine, American television show and advertisement announcer (b. 1940)
 Jerry Reed, American singer, songwriter, actor, and guitarist (b. 1937)
 September 2 – Bill Melendez, Mexican-American character animator, film director, voice artist and producer (b. 1916)
 September 6 – Anita Page, American actress (b. 1910)
 September 9 – Warith Deen Mohammed, American Muslim leader, theologian, philosopher and revivalist (b. 1933)
 September 12 – David Foster Wallace, American writer and columnist (b. 1962)
 September 14 – Hyman Golden, American businessman (b. 1923)
 September 19 – Earl Palmer, American R&B Drummer (b. 1924)
 September 26 – Paul Newman, American actor, film director, entrepreneur and philanthropist (b. 1925)

October 

 October 1 – Robert Arthur, American actor (b. 1925)
 October 5 – Kim Chan, Chinese-American actor (b. 1917)
 October 15 – Edie Adams, American actress, singer, comedian, businesswoman (b. 1927)
 October 17 – Levi Stubbs, American singer and actor (b. 1936)
 October 19
 Mr. Blackwell, American actor, fashion designer and critic (b. 1922)
 Rudy Ray Moore, American actor, musician, and comedian (b. 1927)
 October 26 – Tony Hillerman, American writer (b. 1925)
 October 29 – William Wharton, American author (b. 1925)
 October 31 – Studs Terkel, American writer, broadcaster, and historian (b. 1912)

November 

 November 1 – Tiffany Sloan, American model (b. 1973)
 November 4 
 Michael Crichton, American physician, writer, screenwriter, film and television director and producer (b. 1942)
 Mordechai Dov Brody, American notable euthanasia patient (b. 1996)
 November 10 – Miriam Makeba, South African singer, died in Castel Volturno, Italy (b. 1932)
 November 12 
Catherine Baker Knoll, American educator and politician, 30th Lieutenant Governor of Pennsylvania (b. 1930)
Mitch Mitchell, British musician, died in Portland, Oregon (b. 1947)
 November 13 – Jules Archer, American historian and author (b. 1915) 
 November 21 – Brenden Foster, murder victim (b. 1997)
 November 22 – MC Breed, American rapper (b. 1971)

December 

 December 1 – Paul Benedict, American actor (b. 1938)
 December 2 
 Kathleen Baskin-Ball, American minister (b. 1958)
 Odetta, American singer, American songwriter, musician, actress, and civil rights activist (b. 1930)
 December 4 – Forrest J. Ackerman, American writer, columnist, actor, and science-fiction collector (b. 1916)
 December 5
 Nina Foch, Dutch-born American actress (b. 1924)
 Beverly Garland, American actress and businesswoman (b. 1926)
 December 6 – Sunny von Bülow, socialite and alleged murder victim, wife of Claus von Bülow (b. 1931)
 December 8
 Robert Prosky, American actor (b. 1930)
 William S. Stevens, American lawyer (b. 1948)
 December 11
 Maddie Blaustein, American actress (b. 1960)
 Bettie Page, American model and actress (b. 1923)
 December 12 – Van Johnson, American actor (b. 1916)
 December 14 – Mike Bell, American professional wrestler (b. 1971)
 December 15 – John W. Powell, Chinese-American journalist (b. 1919)
 December 16 – Sam Bottoms, American actor (b. 1955)
 December 17 – Sammy Baugh, American football player and coach (b. 1914)
 December 18
 Majel Barrett, American actress, producer (b. 1932)
 Mark Felt, American FBI agent also known as "Deep Throat" from Watergate scandal (b. 1913)
 December 19 – James Bevel, American minister and civil rights activist (b. 1936)

 December 20 – Robert Mulligan, American film and television director (b. 1925)
 December 24 – Harold Pinter, British Nobel writer, screenwriter, director, and actor, died in London, United Kingdom (b. 1930)
 December 25 – Eartha Kitt, American actress and singer (b. 1927)
 December 29 – Freddie Hubbard, musician (b. 1938)
 December 31 – Donald E. Westlake, American writer and screenwriter (b. 1933)

See also 
 2008 in American soccer
 2008 in American television
 List of American films of 2008
 Timeline of United States history (1990–2009)

References

External links
 

 
2000s in the United States
United States
United States
Years of the 21st century in the United States